Andrea Heidi De Cruz (born 24 June 1974) is a Singaporean actress and psychologist. She left Mediacorp when her contract ended, but continues to work on an ad hoc basis.

Career
De Cruz was a psychologist before going into show business. Although not from a Chinese-speaking background, she speaks Mandarin and has acted in Channel 8 dramas.

Personal life
De Cruz was educated at CHIJ Katong Convent and studied psychology at San Francisco State University. She has been married to fellow MediaCorp actor Pierre Png in 2003.

In 2002, De Cruz was a victim of the Slim 10 pills scandal and suffered from liver failure as a result. Png, who was her boyfriend at that time, donated part of his liver. She filed a lawsuit against various distributors of Slim 10 pills and fellow actor Rayson Tan. De Cruz began her court battle against the importers and distributors of diet pills that she says nearly caused her to die of liver failure.

Lawyers for De Cruz began arguments in the High Court seeking unspecified damages in a civil suit against Health Biz, the importer and distributor of “Slim 10" diet pills. The case was expected to last three weeks. De Cruz sought damages for injuries she alleged were caused by the drug and to cover the cost of her liver transplant surgery and treatment, court documents said. She also sued the pills' distributor, TV Media, and actor Rayson Tan Tai Ming who sold the pills to her. Tan was later cleared while the distributors were forced to compensate her. De Cruz took a 5-year break from acting and later stated that she has moved on from the incident.

In 2017, De Cruz was diagnosed with first stage cervical cancer and had recovered from it. In 2019, she was unable to move the left side of her face due to a 3mm brain aneurysm.

In 2021, De Cruz with Png opened a restaurant, Tipsy Flamingo, as part of the Tipsy Collective at Raffles City Singapore.

Filmography

Film

Television appearances

Variety Shows

Accolades

References

External links
Profile on xin.msn.com
Profile archived from the original 5 April 2010

Singaporean television actresses
Singaporean people of European descent
San Francisco State University alumni
Living people
1974 births